Nihilist was a Swedish death metal band formed in 1987 by Nicke Andersson and Alex Hellid. The band split up in 1989 when Johnny Hedlund left to form Unleashed. The remaining members reformed the band under the name Entombed. Nihilist never recorded a full-length album before they renamed themselves Entombed, but a collection of their demo work was released in 2005. Guitarist Leif "Leffe" Cuzner died in June 2006.

Nicke Andersson admitted in the recent book about the history of death metal and grindcore Choosing Death that after his relationship with Johnny Hedlund had grown ever more acrimonious, he had deliberately split the band up as a means of parting company with him. The last lineup of Nihilist minus Hedlund then reformed under the new name of Entombed, while Hedlund formed his own band Unleashed in reply.

Band members
 Lars-Göran Petrov – vocals (1988–1989)
 Nicke Andersson – drums (1987–1989)
 Leif "Leffe" Cuzner – bass (1987–1988), guitar (1988–1989)
 Johnny Hedlund – bass (1988–1989)
 Alex Hellid – guitar (1987–1989)
 Ulf Cederlund – guitar (1989)
 Matthias "Buffla" Boström – vocals (1987–1988)

Discography
 Premature Autopsy – demo (1988)
 Only Shreds Remain – demo (1989)
 Drowned – demo (1989)
 Drowned – 7" single (1989)
 Nihilist (1987–1989) – (2005)

References

External links
 Interview of Leif Cuzner
 Interview of Lars-Göran Petrov (In French)
 Nihilist compilation review by Vincent Eldefors
 Nihilist at Metal Archives

Musical groups established in 1987
Musical groups disestablished in 1989
Swedish death metal musical groups
Musical quintets
1987 establishments in Sweden
1989 disestablishments in Sweden